The Japanese Arms Export Ban, known as the Three Arms Exports Ban, was a de facto law that governed Japanese export of military hardware outside of the country. The export ban was eased by Shinzo Abe during his second term as prime minister.

The basis of the ban was the Three Principles on Arms Exports adopted by the National Diet of Japan in 1967 dealing with situations in which arms could not be exported from Japan. The three principles were that arms exports were not allowed to go to:

 Communist bloc countries
 Countries under arms exports embargo under United Nations Security Council resolutions
 Countries involved in or likely to be involved in international conflicts

History

After World War II
After the end of World War II, Japan exported some Mitsubishi Type 73 Light Truck (Kyū) jeeps as part of war reparations to the Philippines and to South Vietnam.

Vietnam war
As it had done during the Korean War in the 1950s, during the Vietnam War in the 1960s, Japan sold a large amount of materials to American forces. In 1966, it was reported by the Xinhua News Agency that up to 92% of the napalm being used in Vietnam was manufactured in Japan, and Nippon Yushi Corporation in Aichi prefecture was the suspected manufacturer. The company denied it was producing napalm, but the secretary-general of the plant's union stated that "almost anyone" could produce napalm using the chemicals produced by the company.

Mainichi Shimbun found no proof that napalm bombs were being produced in Japan, but in 1966 the United States did ask for 4,000 Korean War-era napalm bombs at a former US Air Force base to be handed back.

Tightening of restrictions
In 1976, the government of Japan announced that arms exports not restricted by the three principles would also be restrained. Aside from some technology transfers to the United States, Japan banned all arms exports. However, after the Japan Air Self-Defense Force retired their Lockheed F-104J/DJ Starfighter aircraft, thirty-six of them were provided to the Taiwanese Air Force.

Exceptions

Maritime Patrol Boat Exports
Tokyo has granted exceptions for exporting Japanese-made patrol boats. The Japanese Ministry of Foreign Affairs justified its case by providing ODA assistance to Indonesia for securing the Strait of Malacca in June 2003 and February 2004. As these boats were made with bulletproof material, it falls under military vessels under the Export Trade Control Ordinance. An agreement with Jakarta was necessary to ensure that the boats will not be exported to another country and the boats will be used for anti-piracy and law enforcement scenarios. Three patrol boats were made by Sumidagawa Shipyard for the Indonesian National Police's National Police Water Unit. In 2009, a maritime radar system and additional patrol boats were sold to Jakarta.

Other ODA grants were also done with the construction of patrol boats made by Sumidagawa Shipyard for Djibouti, Malaysia and Sri Lanka.

Bor incident
South Korean soldiers in Bor, South Sudan were aided by JGSDF soldiers deployed to South Sudan as part of UNMISS when ammunition supplies were exhausted during an attack from December 19 to 22, 2013. During a National Security Council meeting, they ruled that JGSDF forces should provide ammunition to their South Korean counterparts. This aid was a "Contribution in Kind" scenario which went unused and was returned.

Loosening of restrictions

On April 1, 2014, the total ban on arms exports was ended by the government of Prime Minister Shinzo Abe under the Three Principles on Arms Exports to the 
Three Principles on Defense Equipment Transfers according to the guidelines of the National Security Strategy adopted on December 17, 2013.

Following this, Japan made moves to sell s to Australia and Kawasaki P-1 maritime patrol aircraft to the United Kingdom and New Zealand, but these attempts were not successful.

The SDF Law was amended to allow the sale of JSDF equipment at prices lower than the JSDF's original purchase price.

On November 6, 2022, it was reported that Tokyo is considering the exports of used JSDF MBTs and missile systems to friendly countries. On January 4, 2023, Tokyo is now considering allowing military hardware that has dual use to friendly countries, including the export for UN peacekeeping or humanitarian operations.

Arms exports

India
There are also efforts to sell the ShinMaywa US-2 military flying boats to India. They are stalled due to disagreements on price as of 2021.

On October 15, 2022, Tokyo announced that they will sell the "Unicorn" stealth antenna technology to the Indian military.

Indonesia
Patrol boats were donated to Indonesia in June 2006 before the ban was eased.

Japan plans to export four Mogami-class frigates to Indonesia, with another four to be built in Indonesia under a ¥300 billion contract.

Philippines
The JMSDF planned to lease at least five TC-90 aircraft to the Philippines to conduct maritime patrols. From November 2016, to November 2017, six Philippine Navy pilots were trained to fly the aircraft at Tokushima Airport. Maintenance staff were also trained. Two aircraft were transferred free of charge in March 2017, and three more were to be transferred in 2018. The aircraft were ultimately donated rather than leased.

The Ground Self-Defense Force retired its UH-1H helicopters in 2012. The Philippines had planned to buy 16 new Bell 412 EPI helicopters from Canada, but the deal collapsed. Canada was concerned about how the helicopters would be used. In 2017, Japan offered to supply around 40,000 spare parts for UH-1H aircraft to the Philippines. In 2018 it was announced that Japan would supply the parts to the Philippines free of charge. In March 2019, it was reported that an initial delivery of parts to the Philippine Air Force had been made and more parts were to arrive in August 2019.

According to Defense Secretary Delfin Lorenzana, the Philippines is the first ASEAN nation to get military equipment from Japan.

On October 4, 2022, it was announced that an aerial surveillance radar under a contract by Mitsubishi Electric Corp has been completed and will be delivered.

On December 19, 2022, Tokyo announced that Japanese-made UH-1J choppers will be provided to the AFP.

New Zealand
New Zealand expressed interest in the Kawasaki C-2 aircraft and the Kawasaki P-1 maritime patrol aircraft. New Zealand chose the P-8 Poseidon rather than the Kawasaki P-1.

Thailand
In 2016, efforts to sell an air-defense radar manufactured by Mitsubishi to Thailand were unsuccessful.

United Arab Emirates
There are attempts to sell the C-2 to the United Arab Emirates.

United States
Two retired MH-53E helicopters of the Japan Maritime Self-Defense Force were sold to the United States Navy in 2015 for their components. The United States was running short of parts for its own fleet of the aging aircraft.

On December 24, 2018, it was announced that Tokyo was seriously considering selling their F-15s to Washington in order to acquire funds to purchase F-35s. Washington would consider selling the F-15s to friendly countries with weak air forces.

Vietnam 
In 2020, Japan successfully secured a trade agreement with Vietnam, allowing for the export of Japanese military equipment.

Ukraine
On March 12, 2023, Tokyo is considering to send M270s to Kyiv.

Notes

References 
 

Export and import control
Foreign trade of Japan
Weapons trade